The Elmer C. Jensen House was built in 1905.  It was designed by, and built for, architect Elmer C. Jensen. It is located in the Old Irving Park neighborhood of Chicago, Illinois, United States.

References

Houses completed in 1905
Landmarks in Chicago
Houses in Chicago
1905 establishments in Illinois